Ana Mendes Godinho (born 1972) is a Portuguese legal expert, civil servant and politician. A member of the Portuguese Socialist Party (PS), she is the current Minister of Labour, Solidarity and Social Security in the Portuguese Government, having previously served as Secretary of State for Tourism.

Early life and career
Ana Manuel Jerónimo Lopes Correia Mendes Godinho was born in the Portuguese capital, Lisbon on 29 June 1972. She has a younger brother. She went to high school at Colégio Mira Rio in Lisbon, a private institution linked to Opus Dei. She graduated in law from the Faculty of Law of the University of Lisbon and followed post-graduate studies in Labour Law. After a legal internship, she became a legal consultant to the Portuguese Ministry of National Defence and, later, the Directorate-General for Tourism, between 1997 and 2001. She is a qualified Labour Inspector and from 2001 directed the department for the Support of Inspection Activity at the Portuguese Authority for Working Conditions (ACT). She was vice-president of the Portuguese National Tourism Authority (Turismo de Portugal), and a member of the Board of two tourism companies. She also coordinated the post-graduate degree on Tourism Law at the Lisbon University.

Political career
Mendes Godinho was deputy and chief of staff to the Secretary of State for Tourism, Bernardo Trindade, in the first government led by Prime Minister José Sócrates from 2005. She represented Portugal on the Technical Committee on Tourism and Related Services of the International Organization for Standardization. In 2015, she became Secretary of State for Tourism in the first government of António Costa.

In 2019, Mendes Godinho became Minister of Labour, Solidarity and Social Security in Costa's second government. She was reappointed to that position following the 2022 Portuguese legislative election. As minister, she introduced legislation to ban companies in Portugal from contacting employees outside working hours and make them meet their extra energy and communications costs under what the Financial Times described as “one of Europe’s most employee-friendly laws for regulating homeworking.“

Personal life
Mendes Godinho is married and has three children. In January 2021, she recovered from being infected with COVID-19.

References

1972 births
Living people
Government ministers of Portugal
Women government ministers of Portugal
Socialist Party (Portugal) politicians
People from Lisbon
University of Lisbon alumni